The Stillwater River rises 15 miles south of the border between Montana (United States) and Alberta (Canada), west of Glacier National Park in the Kootenai National Forest. It runs mainly south to Duck Lake, then Upper Stillwater Lake, Lagoni Lake and on to Lower Stillwater Lake. It then flows south to Kalispell where it joins the Whitefish River, very near where that river enters the Flathead River.

See also 

List of rivers of Montana
Montana Stream Access Law

Notes 

Rivers of Montana
Rivers of Flathead County, Montana
Rivers of Lincoln County, Montana